Erdinç Balto is a Turkish professional basketball player who plays as a power forward for Uşak Sportif of the Turkish Basketball League.

External links
Erdinç Balto FIBA Profile
Erdinç Balto TBLStat.net Profile
Erdinç Balto Eurobasket Profile
Erdinç Balto TBL Profile

Living people
Türk Telekom B.K. players
Darüşşafaka Basketbol players
Basketball players from Istanbul
Turkish men's basketball players
Uşak Sportif players
Karşıyaka basketball players
Year of birth missing (living people)
Power forwards (basketball)